Asporin is a protein that in humans is encoded by the ASPN gene.

Function 

ASPN belongs to a family of leucine-rich repeat (LRR) proteins associated with the cartilage matrix. The name asporin reflects the unique aspartate-rich N terminus and the overall similarity to decorin (MIM 125255) (Lorenzo et al., 2001).

References

External links

Further reading 

 
 
 
 
 
 
 
 
 
 
 
 

Extracellular matrix proteins
LRR proteins
Proteoglycans